Comecon was a Swedish death metal project founded in 1990. The band consisted of two guitarists, a drum computer and a session singer; a different one on each album. The debut album featured the Swede Lars-Göran Petrov, who was then dismissed from Entombed. Their second album was sung by Dutchman Martin van Drunen (Asphyx). German Marc Grewe, from Morgoth handled the vocals on their final album. All three albums were produced by Tomas Skogsberg.

Discography 
 Split album with Merciless (1991)
 Megatrends in Brutality (1992)
 Converging Conspiracies (1993)
 Fable Frolic (1995)

Members 
 Rasmus Ekman – guitar, bass
 Pelle Ström – guitar, bass
 Lars-Göran Petrov – vocals (1992)
 Martin van Drunen – vocals (1993)
 Marc Grewe – vocals (1995)

External links
 Band website
 [ Comecon] at AllMusic
 Comecon at Encyclopaedia Metallum

Swedish death metal musical groups
Musical groups established in 1989
Musical groups disestablished in 1995